Odostomia improbabilis is a species of sea snail, a marine gastropod mollusc in the family Pyramidellidae, the pyrams and their allies.

Description
The shell grows to a length of 2.5 mm.

Distribution
This species occurs in the following locations:
 Canary Islands
 Cape Verde
 Congo
 European waters (ERMS scope)
 Greek Exclusive Economic Zone
 Mauritania
 Mediterranean Sea
 Portuguese Exclusive Economic Zone
 Spanish Exclusive Economic Zone

References

 AARTSEN, J.J. van, 1987. European Pyramidellidae. III. Odostomia and Ondina. Bollettino Malacologico, 23(1-4): 1-34.

External links
 Gastropods.com: Odostomia (Odostomia) verduini; retrieved: 103 November 2011
 To CLEMAM
 To Encyclopedia of Life

improbabilis
Gastropods described in 1970
Molluscs of the Atlantic Ocean
Molluscs of the Mediterranean Sea